Satanic may refer to:

 Satan
 Satanism
 Satanic (2006 film), a 2006 American horror film
 Satanic (2016 film), a 2016 American horror film
 Operation Satanic, when the DGSE bombed the Rainbow Warrior in Auckland Harbour

See also

 Satan (disambiguation)
 Satanic panic (disambiguation)
 Satanic verses (disambiguation)
 Satanism (disambiguation)
 Satanist (disambiguation)